Emmons is an unincorporated community located on the Big Coal River in Boone and Kanawha counties in the U.S. state of West Virginia. Jay Rockefeller's political affiliation with West Virginia began in 1964-1965 while he served as a VISTA volunteer in Emmons.

The community bears the name of the Emmons family.

References

Unincorporated communities in Boone County, West Virginia
Unincorporated communities in Kanawha County, West Virginia
Unincorporated communities in West Virginia
Charleston, West Virginia metropolitan area